Jalesky Garcia Padron (born 28 January 1975) is an Icelandic handball player who competed in the 2004 Summer Olympics.

References

1975 births
Living people
Jalesky Garcia Padron
Jalesky Garcia Padron
Handball players at the 2004 Summer Olympics